The Pinzgau Hut or Pinzgauer Hut is a mountain hut at 1,700 m (5,577 ft) above sea level in the Kitzbühel Alps in Salzburg, Austria

Location 
The hut stands west of the Zellersee and Zell am See's local mountain, the Schmittenhöhe (1,965 m), below the Hahnkopf. The hut lies in a large forest clearing just south of the Kessel wind gap (Kesselscharte) on the eastern section of the Pinzgau Ridgeway (Pinzgauer Spaziergang) on long distance trail 02A, only 1½ km as the crow flies from the summit of the Schmittenhöhe and its upper cable car station.

Description 
The Pinzgau Hut is managed by the Austrian Friends of Nature and has 46 places: 6 twin and 5 four-bed rooms and 14 mattress spaces. It is open from the beginning of June to mid-October; and in winter from Christmas to mid-April.

Approaches 
 in summer from Piesendorf in 2 hours; from the Schmittenhöhe cable car in half an hour
 crossing to the Bürgl Hut 6–7 hours
 in winter on touring skis, 2 hours
 from Zell am See/Schüttdorf over the Areitbahn, ski downhill to the valley station of the Kapellenbahn, then 1 km

Summits 
 Maurerkogel (2,074 m) 1½ hours
 Gernkogel (2,175 m) 2½ hours.

References

External links 
 Österr.Karte 1:50.000, Schmittenhöhe to Maurerkogel

Mountain huts in Austria
Zell am See District
Kitzbühel Alps
Buildings and structures in Salzburg (state)